Morlocks are a group of mutant characters appearing in American comic books published by Marvel Comics. The characters are usually depicted as being associated with the X-Men in the Marvel Universe. Created by writer Chris Claremont and artist Paul Smith, they were named after the subterranean race of the same name in H. G. Wells' novel The Time Machine, but unlike in the Wells book, they are not a faceless, threatening mass of villains. They first appeared as a group in The Uncanny X-Men #169 (May 1983). Caliban appeared prior to that, but he was not yet a member of the Morlocks.

The Morlocks were depicted as an underground society (both literally and figuratively) of outcast mutants living as tunnel dwellers in the sewers, abandoned tunnels, and abandoned subway lines beneath New York City. The Morlocks were composed of mutant misfits, especially those mutants who, because of physical mutations or other conspicuous manifestations of their mutant genetics, were unable to pass as human in normal society. Subjected to hate, fear, and disgust from human society due to their "deformed" appearances, dangerous mutations, or otherwise outcast or misfit statuses, most of the Morlocks viewed humans (and even more mainstream mutants such as the X-Men) with distrust and anger, and they occasionally committed criminal or antisocial acts upon the above-ground human society.

Due to a series of tragedies, the original Morlocks no longer reside in subterranean New York City (except Marrow, who was one of the original Morlocks as a child), although a violent splinter cell Gene Nation and a comparable group called Those Who Live in Darkness have emerged. Similar groups, called Morlocks by readers and/or the X-Men themselves, have appeared under Chicago and London.

History
According to Callisto, she formed the Morlocks by first recruiting Caliban, and then using his power to track down other mutants who were unable to integrate into normal society. The Morlocks initially squatted in a network of abandoned, interconnected tunnels beneath Manhattan, which had originally been built as Cold War bomb shelters and then forgotten.

The X-Men were alerted to the existence of the Morlocks when their leader Callisto kidnapped Angel and intended to make him her mate. This brought Storm to challenge Callisto to a duel for leadership of the Morlocks. Victorious, Storm orders an end to their attacks on normal humans, but she does not assume leadership of the Morlocks full-time. Against her wishes, several Morlocks later kidnap the child superheroes Power Pack so that they could be raised by the Morlock Annalee, who had lost her own children. When Callisto discovers what was going on, she forces Annalee to let them go. They promise to return in the future to keep her company.

A majority of the Morlocks are slaughtered by Mister Sinister's Marauders in the "Mutant Massacre". Most of the survivors move on to join Gene Nation, having lived in a pocket dimension led by Mikhail Rasputin. Leech instead becomes a ward of Generation X. Other survivors include Erg and Beautiful Dreamer (whose whereabouts were unknown until "Decimation"), Thornn, (who would join X-Corporation), and Caliban.

It is later revealed that many of the Morlocks were actually failed experiments of the Dark Beast, although he made certain that they didn't remember being tampered with, however Mister Sinister recognized that the Morlocks were based on his own genetic studies (which the Dark Beast learned from the Sinister of his reality), and that's why he ordered the Marauders to kill the entire underground society.

A new group called the Tunnel Rats which also calls itself "Those Who Live in Darkness" have inhabited the sewer tunnels just below the surface of Mutant Town/District X. District X writer David Hine claims to never have intended this group to have any ties to the original Morlocks.

During the "Decimation" storyline, some of the remaining powered Morlocks sought out asylum at the X-Mansion. There were some Morlocks that remained underground under Marrow's protection.

During the "Endangered Species" storyline, Masque and the Morlocks with him began their search for Magneto where they had some future-telling diaries with them where one of them states that Magneto is still a mutant in light of M-Day.

At the time when the Terrigen Cloud was loose on Earth infecting mutants with M-Pox since the "Infinity" storyline, the number of mutants that are living underground had increased. In addition to these mutants, Callisto showed sympathy towards the humans who sought out refuge from the global landscape. As a way to live out the dream of Professor X, this unified society of humans and mutants lived together as the New Morlocks. The Morlock are further decimated by the Mauraders, but Cyclops helps the Chechnyan government expel rebels in exchange for a Morlock sanctuary.

When Krakoa was established as a mutant paradise, the known Morlocks that reside there are Callisto, Caliban, Cybelle, Erg, a revived Healer, Leech, Masque, Marrow, Mole Piper, Skids, and a revived Tommy.

Membership

Founding members
Debuting along with the rest of the Morlocks (with the exception of Caliban) it was revealed that Masque, Caliban, Callisto and Sunder founded the Morlocks under the streets of Manhattan.

 Caliban - Caliban became Death, and later Pestilence - Served on X-Force for a time. Joined the X-Men after "Decimation". He was killed by the Purifiers saving James Proudstar.
 Callisto - Former leader of the Morlocks. Arms were turned into tentacles by Masque. Aided Magneto and Professor X in Genosha. Depowered. Former member Of X-Cell. Currently working in the Hellfire Club on Krakoa.
 Dark Beast - Creator of the Morlocks. From the Age of Apocalypse and the Brotherhood. Infiltrated the X-Men for a time posing as the original Beast. Although not classed as a Morlock, he sees himself as their creator and has been called the "first one" by members of Gene Nation. He was recruited by Norman Osborn as scientist and member of Dark X-Men. Recently he gained control over Clan Akkaba and rebuilt the portal to his own dimension. There he is a member of that reality's Clan Akkaba as well.
 Masque - Former leader after the "Mutant Massacre". Led a splinter group for a time called The Tunnelers. Impaled by Shatterstar's sword but was revealed alive.
 Sunder - Joined the impromptu Muir Island "X-Men" team. Shot by Pretty Boy of the Reavers.

Pre-Mutant Massacre
 Annalee - Emotion projector. Adopts Leech. Shot by Scalphunter in the "Mutant Massacre".
 Ape - Shapeshifter. Captured by the Weapon X program and sent to its Neverland concentration camp and killed.
 Beautiful Dreamer - Altered memories of those "recruited" as Morlocks. Believed killed in the "Mutant Massacre", but listed as alive and powered after "M-Day". Was later infused with the Legacy Virus by the Purifiers and died from the virus's effects.
 Healer - A mutant whose healing powers only work on mutants. He burned himself out to heal and restore Callisto. Healer was later revived when Krakoa was established as a mutant nation.
 Erg - Electrical blaster. Erg was a painter before becoming a Morlock. He was one of the 198. Joined Masque's recent incarnation. Later resurfaced as part of the mutant community on the living island Krakoa.
 Jo - Only appearance as a Morlock was her debut issue as Kitty Pryde's bridesmaid. Current whereabouts unknown.
 Leech - Has been in the first few incarnations of the Morlocks. Adopted son of Annalee. Formerly of X-Terminators and Generation X. Captured by the Weapon X program and used as the Neverland power damper. He was one of The 198 who retained their mutant powers after "House of M". Used by Masque because of the prophecies of Qwerty. Currently a member of Future Foundation.
 Piper - Controlled animals using music. Killed by the Marauders. Resurfaced later, resurrected, as part of the mutant community on Krakoa.
 Plague - Became Pestilence, one of the Horsemen of Apocalypse. Died after falling off her flying horse.
 Skids - Resented because she was seen as the prettiest of the Morlocks (her force field protected her from scars and Masque's powers). She left them and became a ward of X-Factor. After "M-Day", she became a follower of Apocalypse and is friends with Scalphunter. Was part of Masque's new group of Morlock Extremists, as a spy for S.H.I.E.L.D.
 Storm - X-Man who defeated Callisto in a duel to become the Morlocks' leader, although not classified as a Morlock. Former Fantastic Four member and former Queen of Wakanda. Currently a member of the X-Men.
 Tar Baby - Secretes adhesive. Captured by the Weapon X program, sent to the Neverland concentration camp and killed.
 Annalee's four children - Shot by Scalphunter. Only later revealed that Scalphunter was the one who killed the four children.

Mutant Massacre

The "Mutant Massacre" was one of Marvel's annual crossovers events, centering on the Morlocks. The event resulted in the Marauders killing many of the Morlocks under orders of Mr. Sinister. Only a few survived, with the protection of the X-Men, X-Factor, Power Pack and Thor. The event spanned The Uncanny X-Men #210–212, X-Factor #9–11, The New Mutants #46, Thor #373–374 and Power Pack #27. Many new Morlocks debuted, although many were killed in their first appearance.

 Berzerker - An electric mutant who was formerly part of Masque's splinter group, The Tunnelers. Killed by electrocuting himself with his own powers.
 Blowhard - A wind-exhaling mutant who was formerly part of Masque's splinter group The Tunnelers. Shot by the Savage Wolf Gang leader.
 Cybelle - Acid-secreting Tunneler. Killed by Harpoon. Resurfaced later as one of the many resurrected mutants on Krakoa.
 Scaleface - A female mutant who was formerly part of Masque's splinter group, The Tunnelers. Shot by the police in her reptile form. Subsequently revived several times as a zombie.
 Tommy - A young girl capable of adopting a two-dimensional form. Shot by Scalphunter after she accidentally led the Marauders to the entrance to the Morlocks' home. It was later revealed that this was Gambit's doing. She resurfaced years later as one of the many resurrected mutants on Krakoa.
 Zeek - Killed by Harpoon.

Post-Mutant Massacre
Most of the surviving Morlocks relocated themselves throughout New York City after the massacre. Few, however, returned to the Alley, their original home. There, Masque assumed leadership. Many new surviving Morlocks were introduced when Sabretooth decided to finish his original task. He is stopped by a newly "upgraded" Caliban. Later, a splinter group of the Morlocks is introduced. This group, led by Pixie, attempts to escape Masque.

 Alex - Alex is an amorphous, blob-like creature, able to engulf and smother others. Current whereabouts and status unknown.
 Bertram - Current whereabouts and status unknown.
 Bliss - Has the power of a poisonous bite. Was a part of Masque's new group of Morlock Extremists.
 Bouncer - Mass teleporter. Current whereabouts and status unknown.
 Brute - Shot by Cable.
 Chickenwings - Killed by Sabretooth.
 Ent - Superhuman strength. Current whereabouts and status unknown.
 Feral - Left the Morlocks. She was depowered as a result of "Decimation" but she regained her physical mutation, only to be killed by Sabretooth. She does return again but as a ghost to serve as a tracker for deities and demons.
 Hump - Brute's brother. Current whereabouts and status unknown.
 Lightning Bug - Killed in the "Mutant Massacre". Astral essence survived and searches out a new form to inhabit.  Its essence later perished.
 Mole - Could tunnel through solid matter. It is strongly implied that Mole was killed by Sabretooth However, he actually survived by digging to safety and laid low until Krakoa was established as a mutant nation.
 Mother Inferior - Could communicate with rats, cockroaches, and other vermin. Crushed by falling debris.
 Pester - Daughter-in-law of Mother Inferior. Possesses superhuman speed and fangs. Current whereabouts and status unknown.
 Pixie - Led a splinter group of Morlocks on the run from Masque. Murdered by Blackout.
 Samson - Killed by Sabretooth
 Thornn - Left the Morlocks after the Great Flood. Depowered as a result of "Decimation", but she regained her physical mutation.

The Hill
With Masque presumed killed, an insane Mikhail Rasputin takes over as leader of the Morlocks in The Uncanny X-Men #293. He floods the tunnels, attempting to destroy the remaining Morlocks. It is revealed later that he actually transported the Morlocks to another dimension dubbed the Hill, whose timeline moved faster than the main Marvel Universe. There, he set himself up as their king and forced them to fight for the right to live.

 Brain Cell - Current whereabouts and status unknown.
 Marilou - Killed by Mikhail Rasputin.
 Marrow - One of the Morlocks that were transported to the Hill dimension by Mikhail Rasputin. Returned to lead a terrorist faction known as Gene Nation. Seemingly killed by Storm. Revealed to have survived with the help of a second heart. Formerly of the X-Men, S.H.I.E.L.D., X-Cell and the Weapon X program. Only Gene Nation member who was a real Morlock (not being born in The Hill). Depowered.
 MeMe - Mind shut down by Jean Grey to rescue humans he absorbed.
 Monte - Current whereabouts and status unknown.
 Mikhail Rasputin - Former leader of the Morlocks. Transported them to the Hill dimension. Banished himself to Kapalan.
 Sack - A mutant with possession ability.

Africa/Gene Nation
With the Morlocks presumed dead from the floods caused by Mikhail Rasputin, some of the remaining Morlocks were relocated to Selima Oasis in North Africa. When attacked by Humanity's Last Stand, an emotional backlash caused D'Gard to assume control over Storm, who relinquished her leadership role. In X-Men: Prime many of the Hill Morlocks returned to found Gene Nation. As the new group, they attacked the human oppressors of the past Morlocks under the leadership of Marrow. It is unknown whether the remaining Morlocks of Africa stayed there or relocated to New York. A few have been seen there since, as well as a few Morlocks who chose to remain in New York City despite previous attempts on their lives.

 Boost - One of the surviving Morlocks. Helped the Brotherhood of Mutants escape in exchange for being relocated to North Africa. Depowered.
 Carver - Leader of a splinter group of five Morlocks who survived the Massacre and the Flood and who still followed the old Morlock rules.
 D'Gard - Became leader of the Morlocks while in North Africa when he made Storm relinquish her leadership. Killed by Marrow as a sign of loyalty to the new Weapon X program
 Fever Pitch - A mutant whose body is composed of organic flames.
 Fugue - Member of the splinter group of five who still follow the old Morlocks rule.
 Revelation - Revealed to have been in suspended animation around the time of Storm's becoming the Morlock leader as a result of her death-powers. Died in the Punisher's arms.
 Soteira - Revealed to be around at the time Storm became Morlock leader. Was the scientist that put Revelation in suspended animation. Appeared as a hologram telling Wolverine and the Punisher she will die as a result of prolonged exposure to Revelation's powers.
 Tether - One of the surviving Morlocks. Helped the Brotherhood of Mutants escape in exchange for being relocated to North Africa. Depowered.
 Ever - Member of Gene Nation and later member of Havok's Brotherhood. His body was composed of brain matter, granting him telepathic abilities.
 Reverb - Member of Gene Nation. Can focus his mental powers psychometrically, conducting clairvoyance and psychic bursts through the walls and floor of his surroundings. Killed by Storm.
 Membrain - Member of Gene Nation. Composed of mucous membrane, allowing him to liquify himself and flow at will, mucous has psychic properties that allow him to view distant places and stun his opponents.
 Vessel - Member of Gene Nation. Can drain the physical and psychic residue released from the recently deceased, increasing his physical size, strength, endurance, and resistance to injury. Killed by Agent Zero.
 Integer - Member of Dark Beast's Gene Nation. Exists in a conceptual mathematical state, making him intangible and capable of scrambling the thought patterns of others.
 Opsidian - Member of Dark Beast's Gene Nation. Exists in a state of pure darkforce, which makes him intangible, invisible while in shadow, able to stretch in light, and allows him to cast a negative empathic effect over others

After M-Day
After M-Day, some former Morlocks who lost their powers were Angel Dust, Boost, Callisto, Delphi, Irving, Marrow, Postman, Qwerty, Shatter, Tether and the probability of Feral and Thornn. However, Feral and Thornn were later seen re-powered; but this was later to be revealed in Wolverine vol. 3 #54-55 that only their physical mutations were restored, not their mutant powers, which led to Feral being killed by Sabretooth.

In one of Generation M's "Ex-Mutants' Diaries," Sally interviews Marrow about the Morlocks. Marrow reports that 80% of the remaining Morlocks (which was most likely already very small) are depowered now and look like humans. She states that most of them are still afraid about going out of the tunnels.

Currently, Marrow works as a watchman of the Morlocks, as she is called by the remaining ones when problems occur. She explained this status in the aftermath of thirteen depowered Morlocks murdered by Ghoul.

One character commented that, post-M-Day, the chance of meeting a Morlock in the tunnels under New York is now harder than meeting an alligator in the Floridian sewers.

Some former Morlocks who actually kept their powers sought refuge at Xavier's Institute and became known as the 198. They are Beautiful Dreamer, Caliban, Erg, Leech, and Skids.

Dark Beast and Mikhail Rasputin are also still powered, though Mikhail is in Kapalan.

The Extremists
During Ed Brubaker's "The Extremists" arc, the Morlocks reappear under the leadership of Masque and now consisting of Bliss, Erg, Litterbug, Skids and a recently captured Leech. Later in this story, it was revealed Skids only joined the Morlocks to spy on them on behalf of S.H.I.E.L.D.

Morlocks Appearing During the Decimation Era
Powered
 Beautiful Dreamer - Killed by the Purifiers using a new form of the Legacy Virus
 Bliss - A resident of Utopia
 Joe Bugs - An insect-like mutant who was shown only in flashback. Killed by a clone of Kraven the Hunter called Xraven.
 Caliban - Killed by the Reavers during the events of Messiah Complex
 Erg - a resident of Utopia
 Feral - originally depowered on M-Day; her physical mutations were restored by Romulus for unknown reasons before she was killed by Sabretooth
 Fever Pitch - killed by the Purifiers using a new form of the Legacy Virus
 Leech - a member of the Future Foundation
 Litterbug - a resident of Utopia
 Masque - whereabouts are unknown
 Sack - formerly a resident of Utopia; killed by a Nimrod Sentinel during the events of "Second Coming"
 Skids - an agent of S.H.I.E.L.D.

Depowered
 Callisto - in the tunnels
 Marrow - a member of X-Force. She has had a simulacrum of her powers reactivated through technological means
 Thornn - her physical mutations were restored by Romulus for unknown reasons; whereabouts are unknown

Former leaders not involved with group
 Dark Beast - the leader of Clan Akkaba
 Mikhail Rasputin - banished himself to Kapalan
 Storm - affiliated with the X-Men and the Jean Grey School of Higher Learning and Uncanny X-Force

Other groups
There are other groups that are related to the main Morlocks group:

Chicago Morlocks
In June 2002, Marvel released a four-part limited series, Morlocks. In it, a small group of mutants living in the sewers of Chicago help each other to fulfill their one last wish on the surface while trying to escape the mutant-hunting Sentinels.
 
 Angel Dust - She ran away from home upon discovering she was a mutant, to protect her family from possible Sentinel attacks. Adrenaline gives her bursts of super-strength. Confirmed to be depowered by S.H.I.E.L.D.
 Cell - Robber and gang member whose body transformed into a giant, single-celled body capable of extending pseudopods and engulfing objects which then are digested.  Executed by the Sentinels.
 Electric Eve - Former heroin addict and prostitute whose body produces massive amounts of electrical energy that can be extended outward in bolts of electricity. As a side-effect of her powers, the synapses in her brain short-out from time to time, incapacitating her for several minutes. Current whereabouts and status unknown.
 Litterbug - Former soldier who went AWOL upon his transformation into a giant, cockroach-like creature with massive strength, invulnerability, and a keen burrowing ability. He has difficulty speaking in this form. Member of the recent incarnation of New York Morlocks.
 Postman - Leader of the Chicago Morlocks. Can telepathically erase specific memories from targets (such as an event) or complex and deeply rooted facts or knowledge. Depowered.
 Shatter - His body is composed of a hard crystalline material that can regenerate lost body parts over time, and also can crystallize liquids upon contact. Depowered.
 Trader - Former stockbroker who has a chameleon-like ability to camouflage into his surroundings. Killed taking a bullet meant for Electric Eve.

London Tunnel Dwellers
In The Uncanny X-Men #397–398, parts 3 and 4 of the Poptopia story, a group of Morlocks living in the tunnels of London are introduced. They were being pursued by an agent of the Church of Humanity named Mr. Clean, a genetically engineered human who was stalking and killing mutants. This was their only appearance. It is unknown whether or not they survived the persecution of the Church of Humanity.

 Burning Puddle - Son of Miss Saccharine. Sweats acid. Current whereabouts and status unknown.
 Carla - Mole-like woman. Current whereabouts and status unknown.
 Cyclops - A one-eyed mutant with super-strength who is not to be confused with the X-Men member of the same name. He died buying his fellow London Tunnel Dwellers some time to get away from Mr. Clean.
 Double Helix - A two-headed man. Current whereabouts and status unknown.
 Harmony - Mother of Hope; has gills. Current whereabouts and status unknown.
 Hope - Harmony's newborn baby. Current whereabouts and status unknown.
 Miss Saccharine - Elderly woman and mother of Burning Puddle whose sweat is a sugar-like substance. Current whereabouts and status unknown.

Other versions

Age of Apocalypse
In the 10th anniversary of the "Age of Apocalypse" event, which takes place after the nuclear attack in X-Men: Omega, several characters who were not in the original storyline are introduced, among them are the Morlocks which includes Feral, Leech, Marrow, Skids and Thornn among many other unnamed mutants.

The Morlocks were largely a peaceful group that refused to follow Apocalypse's regime and for that decision they were all captured and imprisoned in the Breeding Pens for gruesome experiments by Sinister and the Beast. One known Morlock member was Artemis.

After the fall of Apocalypse, a trail of escaped mutants from the Breeding Pens lead the X-Men underground, they encountered a group of scared, orphaned children called the Morlocks. The X-Men offered to help bring them out of hiding in the sewers, but the Morlocks lashed out at them for fear of being locked up and thrown back into cages by the X-Men, now mutant-hunting officers of the newly restored human government. The X-Men emerged victorious and the Morlocks were brought back to the Xavier Institute where they were detained.

Ultimate Marvel
The Morlocks in the Ultimate Marvel universe have a more sophisticated underground living situation than the mainstream Morlocks, including at least one mutant with energy-generating powers to provide electricity, hydroponic gardens to provide or supplement their food supply, and external air-exchange vents.

In Ultimate X-Men #80 Nightcrawler saves the Morlock named Pyro, who was outnumbered while fighting the Friends of Humanity and the police. Other members shown as of issue #82 are Caliban, Callisto, Sparks and Sunder (who was the leader). After a fight with the X-Men (who were trying to rescue Toad), the Morlocks elected Nightcrawler as their new leader. In #90 Mister Sinister finishes his 10 mutant kills at the Morlock base. His kills include Leech and Angel.

In other media

Film
 In X2, a file named "Morlocks" appears on the desktop of Stryker's computer.
 The Morlocks appear in X-Men: The Last Stand, though never mentioned by that name. Instead, they are referred to as The Omegas. Callisto is still the leader (she possessed Caliban's mutant sensory ability and Quicksilver's speed), but other members (including Arclight, Glob Herman, Phat, Psylocke, Quill/Kid Omega, and Spike) are pulled from other parts of The X-Men universe. Leech also appears in the film, with no apparent connection to The Omegas.
 Angel Dust appears in Deadpool, portrayed by Gina Carano. This Angel Dust is a partner to Ed Skrein's Ajax as she is there when giving Wade Wilson the serum designed to awaken his mutant genes and eventually turn him into Deadpool. She fights alongside Ajax in the final act of the film against Wilson, Colossus, and Negasonic Teenage Warhead and is defeated by the latter two.

Music
 The Northern California thrash metal band Hatchet have a song called "Morlock's Tomb" based on the characters from X-Men.

Television
 The Morlocks appear in X-Men: The Animated Series. Its members are Annalee, Ape, Caliban, Callisto, Erg, Glowworm, Leech, Masque, Mole, Marianna, Plague, Scaleface, Sunder, Tar Baby, and Tommy. They first appear in "Captive Hearts" where the Morlocks captured Cyclops and Jean Grey. The X-Men led by Storm then came to get Jean and Cyclops back. In the end after a duel between Storm and Callisto, not only did the X-Men get Cyclops and Jean back, Storm also gained leadership of the Morlocks. They would have a major role to play in the episode "Out of the Past" and were last seen in "Have Yourself a Morlock Little X-Mas". Several of the Morlocks would have subsequent cameos in this show outside of the sewers where Tar Baby was seen in "Sanctuary", Ape and Mole were seen in "Secrets, Not Long Buried" among the inhabitants of Skull Mesa, and Callisto and Mole were in "Graduation Day" among the mutants that form an army for Magneto to lead.
 The Morlocks have appeared in the X-Men: Evolution episode "X-Treme Measures". The members of the Morlocks represented include Caliban, Callisto, Cybelle, and Scaleface. The series also introduced the Morlock characters Facade (a mutant boy with camouflage powers who can blend with his surroundings), Lucid (a mutant with X-Ray vision who is voiced by Lee Tockar), and Torpid (a mute mutant little girl with a paralyzing touch coming from her large hands). Unlike their comic counterparts, they have no facial reconstructions as bestowed by Masque (who is not featured in this series), although some are naturally ugly due to their mutations. The Morlocks first appear attacking a beverage factory because something in the drinks is poisonous to mutants. It leaked into the tunnels, causing some of the unnamed members to fall ill. Spyke later joined them to protect the weaker Morlocks. In the episode "Uprising", Spyke protects the Morlocks and convinces them not to stay hidden. The Morlocks later help Spyke and the X-Men fight Duncan Matthews and his friends when they start attacking mutants.
 The Morlocks have appeared in The Gifted season two episode "coMplications". They are led by Erg.

Video games
 In the video game X-Men Legends, the X-Men must go on a mission to rescue Gambit from the Morlocks. Marrow is the leader of the militant Gene Nation which is represented as a faction of Morlocks. Healer also plays an important part in the game as he sells health and energy potions to the player. Aside from Marrow and Healer are a substantial number of unnamed Morlock Grunts, Morlock Claws, Morlock Goths, Morlock Lieutenants, Morlock Giants, Morlock Leviathans, and Morlock Blades.
 In X-Men Legends II: Rise of Apocalypse, the Morlocks have been brainwashed by Apocalypse and Mister Sinister, leaving Marrow as a known survivor where she has joined Moira MacTaggert and others in helping rescue refugees.
 The Morlock Tunnels appear in the video game Marvel Heroes. The Morlock Tunnels come under attack by the Purifiers.

Reception
The Morlocks were ranked #14 on a listing of Marvel Comics' monster characters in 2015.

References

External links
 Morlocks at Marvel.com
 Morlocks at Marvel Wiki
 Morlocks at Comic Vine
 Uncannyxmen.net feature on Morlocks

Marvel Comics mutants
Marvel Comics titles
Characters created by Chris Claremont
X-Men
Fictional secret societies
Fictional organizations in Marvel Comics